Yagya Bahadur Bogati is a Nepalese politician, belonging to the Nepal Communist Party currently serving as the member of the 1st Federal Parliament of Nepal. In the 2017 Nepalese general election he was elected from the Achham 2 constituency, securing 21965(53.26%)  votes.

References

Nepal MPs 2017–2022
Living people
Communist Party of Nepal (Unified Marxist–Leninist) politicians
1976 births